The Hill is a suburb of Johannesburg, South Africa. The area lies to the south of the Johannesburg CBD and is surrounded by the suburbs of Regents Park, Rosettenville and Linmeyer. It is located in Region F of the City of Johannesburg Metropolitan Municipality.

History
The suburb is situated on part of an old Witwatersrand farm called Klipriviersberg. It would be proclaimed as suburb on 29 January 1919 and its name is derived from hill it sits upon.

Education
It contains a government high school, called The Hill High School. Another school in the suburb is an independent Anglican school called St. Martin's School. W.H. Coetzer Primary School opened in 1952 and is named after a South African artist W.H. Coetzer.

Parks and green-space
Moffat Park lies to east the suburb and was land donated to the City of Johannesburg by Johan Abram Moffat and on 19 May 1936 became a park named after him. The park consisted of a portion of land once part of an old Witwatersrand farm called Klipriviersberg. The park, consisting of natural veld, is now earmarked for housing development.

Infrastructure
The suburb is the home to a public hospital called South Rand Hospital which opened on 18 June 1954 by the Transvaal Administrator Dr William Nicol.

References

Johannesburg Region F